The Third Skin is a 1954 thriller novel by the British writer John Bingham. It was released in the United States three years later in 1957, published by Dodd Mead with an alternative title Murder Is a Witch.

References

Bibliography
 Reilly, John M. Twentieth Century Crime & Mystery Writers. Springer, 2015.

1954 British novels
British thriller novels
Novels by John Bingham
Victor Gollancz Ltd books